The 2021 FC Tucson season is the eleventh season in the soccer team's history and their third in USL League One. On February 18, 2021, Phoenix Rising FC transferred ownership of FC Tucson to Benevolent Sports Tucson LLC, led by Rising co-owner Brett Johnson.

Players and staff

Current roster

Coaching staff

Front Office Staff

Competitions

Exhibitions

USL League One

Standings

Results summary

Match results

USL League One Playoffs

Statistics
(regular-season & Playoffs)

One Own Goal scored by North Carolina FC

Goalkeepers

References 

FC Tucson
FC Tucson
FC Tucson
FC Tucson
FC Tucson seasons